The Honourable Justice John Robertson Sackar KC is a current Judge of the Supreme Court of New South Wales. Sackar was an Australian Queen's Counsel, who also appeared in the courts of London and Brunei.

Education and early legal career 
Sackar attended Sydney Boys High School and then Sydney University, graduating with a Bachelor of Laws in 1972 after initially studying medicine. He would later go on to receive a Master of Laws from the same institution.

Sackar was admitted to practice as a solicitor in 1973, beginning his legal career at Hickson Lakeman & Holcombe (now Hicksons Lawyers) as an articled clerk under the guidance of David Kirby and Jim Poulos. Sackar then practised as a solicitor at Dawson Waldron (now Ashurst Australia).

Years as a barrister 
Sackar was called to the New South Wales Bar in 1975 and appointed Queen's Counsel in 1987. He was a member of the Sixth Floor of Selborne Chambers in Phillip Street, Sydney for most of his time at the Bar. Australian Prime Minister Malcolm Turnbull read with Justice Sackar in his early years at the NSW Bar. Sackar was called to the Middle Temple in London during 2006, with chambers at 4-5 Gray's Inn Square.

Judicial appointment 
Justice Sackar was appointed to the Supreme Court of New South Wales in February 2011. He sits in the Equity Division of the Court and is currently its Expedition list Judge.

Interests 
Sackar is a passionate art collector and agriculturalist.

References 

Year of birth missing (living people)
Living people
Judges of the Supreme Court of New South Wales
Australian King's Counsel